Fermo posta Tinto Brass is a 1995 Italian comedy film-erotic film directed by Tinto Brass and set in vignettes.

Plot
Tinto Brass and his secretary Lucia (Cinzia Roccaforte) are in the Venice office of the director. Lucia reads letters (one accompanied by a videocassette) sent to Brass by seven of his female fans from around Italy and they reflect on these women's sexual fantasies. Tinto Brass uses his own name and is mentioned as an erotic film master.

Cast
 Tinto Brass as Himself 
 Cinzia Roccaforte as Lucia, Secretary of Tinto Brass
 Laura Gualtieri as Milena, Dario's Fiancee and writer of first letter 
 Erika Savastani as Elena (Michelle) -Guido's Wife and writer of second letter
 Paolo Lanza as Carlo and Guido, Elena's Husband
 Alessandra Antonelli as Betta, woman in Ruins and writer of third letter
 Carla Solaro as Francesca and writer of fourth letter
 Cristina Rinaldi as Ivana
 Sara Cosmi as Sofia, Elena's Prostitute Friend
 Gaia Zucchi as Renata / Piero's Wife
 Gabriella Barbuti as Rossella
 Laura Gualtieri
 Claudia Biagiotti as Maria
 Luca Flauto
 Pascal Persiano as Paolo
 Gianni De Martiis
 Andrea Scataglini
 Ghibly F. Lombardi
 Maurizio Prudenzi as Francesca's Swap Partner
 Cristian Marazziti
 Susanna Bugatti as girl in videotape
 Anita Divizia as girl came to audition
 Stefania Corradetti
 Sabrina Romeo
 Laura Paparesta

External links

1995 films
Commedia sexy all'italiana
1990s Italian-language films
1990s sex comedy films
Films directed by Tinto Brass
Films scored by Riz Ortolani
1995 comedy films
1990s Italian films